Circus Hammock is a  preserve with unpaved walking trails in Sarasota, Florida. The name is a reference to the historic winter quarters of the Ringling Brothers Circus. Habitat at the preserve includes hydric hammock.

The property was purchased by Sarasota County in June 2006 through the Environmentally Sensitive Lands Protection Program (ESLPP). Wildlife inhabiting the area include woodpeckers, box turtles, red-shouldered hawks, barred owls and song birds. The entrance is adjacent to 17th Street Paw Park and north of 17th Street Park.

References

Landforms of Sarasota County, Florida
Protected areas of Sarasota County, Florida
Protected areas established in 2006
2006 establishments in Florida